The Conservatoire (formally The Blackheath Conservatoire of Music and the Arts) is an educational charity in Blackheath, on the border of the London boroughs of Greenwich and Lewisham. The Conservatoire of Music and the Arts took on its current structure in 1991 with the merger of the Blackheath Conservatoire of Music and the Blackheath School of Art, which until that point had operated separately on the adjoining sites, but under the same board.

The Conservatoire is so called as it was a generic term for a music school at the time of its establishment, but it is not one in the present sense of a higher education establishment dedicated to music, and does not award its own qualifications. It does, however, offer GCSEs and A-levels, along with graded music exams.

The Conservatoire offers classes in art, music and drama for adults and children.

History

Blackheath Conservatoire of Music (1881–1991)
The Conservatoire of Music was founded by a local group led by William Webster (son of wealthy building contractor William Webster) in 1881, and operated out of temporary premises on nearby Bennett Park until the completion of its building in 1896. Unlike the School of Art, it has taught continuously since its founding.

Blackheath School of Art (1896–1991)
The School of Art was taken over by the Army during World War II, and remained in government hands as office accommodation. In 1985, it was reopened as an art school, but proved financially unsustainable and was absorbed into the Conservatoire of Music.

Post-merger: The Conservatoire (1991–present)
The combined organisation expanded beyond music and art to include drama and cultural courses. It also expanded beyond the site to engage in partnerships with other bodies, such as the University of Greenwich, Christ the King Sixth Form College and Oxleas NHS Foundation Trust.

Closure threat
In January 2013 the Conservatoire was threatened with closure because of funding difficulties.

Buildings

Both the Conservatoire of Music building and School of Art building were completed in 1896. The architects were James Edmeston and Edward Gabriel. Both buildings are now Grade II-listed. Adjoining these buildings is Blackheath Halls.

It is believed to be the oldest purpose built multi-arts building in London and one of the few to have a fully operational Victorian life drawing studio.

Notable students and teachers

 Douglas Percy Bliss
 York Bowen
 Cecil Ross Burnett
 George Bertram Carter
 Stephen Coombs
 Nora Cundell 
 Harry Farjeon
 Eric Gill
 James Laver
 Decima Moore
 Heddle Nash
 George Newson
 John Platt
 Violet Sanders
 Norman Sillman
 John Skeaping
 Sidney Torch
 Harold Truscott
 Fatimah Tuggar
 Gary Oldman
 Jools Holland
 Kate Bush
 Daniel Day-Lewis
 Eska Mtungwazi
 Dorothy M. Wheeler

References

External links
The Conservatoire

Educational institutions established in 1881
Educational charities based in the United Kingdom
Grade II listed buildings in the Royal Borough of Greenwich
1881 establishments in the United Kingdom
Blackheath, London